Adiel Palma López (born August 20, 1970) is a Cuban left-handed pitcher for the Cuban national baseball team and Cienfuegos of the Cuban National Series. Palma was on the gold medal-winning Cuban team at the 2004 Summer Olympics and the silver medal-winning team at the 2006 World Baseball Classic.

During the 2005-06 Cuban National Series, Palma was only 5–9 with a 5.02 ERA, but did strike out 109 batters in only 123⅔ innings.

References

External links
 

1970 births
Living people
Olympic baseball players of Cuba
Olympic gold medalists for Cuba
Olympic silver medalists for Cuba
Olympic medalists in baseball
Medalists at the 2004 Summer Olympics
Medalists at the 2008 Summer Olympics
Baseball players at the 2004 Summer Olympics
Baseball players at the 2008 Summer Olympics
Pan American Games gold medalists for Cuba
Baseball players at the 2003 Pan American Games
Baseball players at the 2007 Pan American Games
2006 World Baseball Classic players
Pan American Games medalists in baseball
Central American and Caribbean Games gold medalists for Cuba
Competitors at the 2006 Central American and Caribbean Games
Central American and Caribbean Games medalists in baseball
Medalists at the 2003 Pan American Games
Medalists at the 2007 Pan American Games